The 2022–23 Little Rock Trojans men's basketball team represented the University of Arkansas at Little Rock in the 2022–23 NCAA Division I men's basketball season. The Trojans, led by fifth-year head coach Darrell Walker, played their home games at the Jack Stephens Center in Little Rock, Arkansas, as first-year members of the Ohio Valley Conference. They finished the season 10–21, 6–12 in OVC play to finish in ninth place. They failed to qualify for the OVC Tournament.

Previous season
The Trojans finished the 2021–22 season 9–19, 3–11 in Sun Belt play to finish in last place. As the No. 12 seed, they upset No. 5 seed South Alabama in the first round of the Sun Belt tournament, before falling to Troy in the quarterfinals. This was the school's last season as a member of the Sun Belt Conference, as they moved to the Ohio Valley Conference, effective July 1, 2022.

Roster

Schedule and results
Due to unseasonably cold weather, a water coil at the Trojans' normal home of Jack Stephens Center froze and burst on December 28, flooding the court. The team's next home game on December 29 was moved to Simmons Bank Arena in North Little Rock. The Stephens Center reopened for the January 4 game against Lindenwood.

|-
!colspan=12 style=""| Non-conference regular season

|-
!colspan=12 style=""| OVC regular season

Sources

References

Little Rock Trojans men's basketball seasons
Little Rock Trojans
Little Rock Trojans men's basketball
Little Rock Trojans men's basketball